The Pig Hunt may refer to:

Pig Hunt
Grisjakten or The Pig Hunt